Marco Caligiuri (born 14 April 1984) is a German former professional footballer who played as a midfielder for Greuther Fürth for most of his career.

Career
Born in Villingen-Schwenningen, Caligiuri made his debut on the professional league level in the Bundesliga for MSV Duisburg on 18 January 2006 when he started in a game against VfB Stuttgart, scoring on his debut. On 16 March 2010, he announced his intention to leave Greuther Fürth.

On 30 March 2010, Caligiuri signed a contract with 1. FSV Mainz 05. He joined his new club on 1 July 2010. After three years in Mainz, it was announced on 15 May 2013 that Caligiuri would move to Eintracht Braunschweig. He left Braunschweig after the 2013–14 Bundesliga season.

On 22 August 2014, Caligiuri re-joined his former club Greuther Fürth. In May 2020, Greuther Fürth announced Caligiuri's contract would not be renewed. In June he retired from playing.

Personal life
He is the brother of FC Augsburg player Daniel Caligiuri and was born to a German mother and an Italian father.

Career statistics

References

External links
 
 Marco Caligiuri at kicker.de 
 

1984 births
Living people
People from Villingen-Schwenningen
Sportspeople from Freiburg (region)
German people of Italian descent
German footballers
Footballers from Baden-Württemberg
Association football midfielders
Germany youth international footballers
BSV 07 Schwenningen players
VfB Stuttgart II players
VfB Stuttgart players
MSV Duisburg players
SpVgg Greuther Fürth players
SpVgg Greuther Fürth II players
1. FSV Mainz 05 players
1. FSV Mainz 05 II players
Eintracht Braunschweig players
Eintracht Braunschweig II players
Bundesliga players
2. Bundesliga players
Regionalliga players